La Boissière-en-Gâtine is a commune in the Deux-Sèvres department in the Nouvelle-Aquitaine region in western France.

History 
There used to be a commandery of the Knights Templar, which later passed to the Hospitallers, hence the name L'Hôpiteau de la Boissière-en-Gâtine.
Maison du Temple de La Boissière-en-Gâtine

La Boissiére-en-Gatine is in the canton of Maziéres en
Gatine but in fact geographically speaking it is nearer to
Allonne.

St Martin's church, which was restored in the 18th
century, is a Romanesque building. The door dates from
the 11th century. The bell tower was built in the 17th
century. The church has been on the list of historical
monuments since 1929.

During the revolution, Louis-Hercule Terrasson, the local
priest, swore allegiance to the Constitution. He was
attacked by the Vendéens who did not accept his
republican opinions. He defended himself and managed to
fight them off. Later he abandoned his parish and fled to
Champdeniers. However, he regretted having resigned
and took up his functions again. He was still priest in La
Boissiére in 1798.

La Boissiére is the home of the Maison Noble (mansion
house) of Puy Robin and there was, at one time, a
commandery which later belonged to the charitable order
of Jerusalem.

Situated between Puymonnier and la Roche-Marot this
place was, according to local legends, the meeting place
for little elves called “fadets.” During an evening party a
shepherdess crushed the Fadet»'s big toe with her
spindle because he was getting on her nerves.
The Fadets are wild and very hairy. They like rocky places where they live in community. Apart from their hairiness, you can recognize the Fadets by their thick unbleached woolen panties. There are Madames Fadets, the Fadettes, they are just as grumpy as their gruff husbands but still prettier. Their number has steadily decreased over the centuries. Nowadays, they are few and very difficult to observe.

Administration 

Maire de La Boissière-en-Gâtine (79)

Demographics 
From the 21st century, the actual censuses of municipalities with less than 10,000 inhabitants take place every five years. For La Boissière-en-Gâtine, this corresponds to 2004, 2009, 2014, etc. The other “census” dates (2006, 2009, etc.) are legal estimates.

Economy 
The village has an economic activity based on agriculture, especially livestock. The main employer in the commune is the company Boye Accouvage, which employs about a hundred people.

Places and monuments 
The Church of Saint-Martin is classified as an historical monument from the 12th century.

See also
Communes of the Deux-Sèvres department
A small Hamlet of La Boissiere en Gatine and although in a rural setting, it is not isolated as it is close to the Towns of Secondigny and medieval town of Partaney in the Deux-Sèvres, Nouvelle-Aquitaine. With its many small hamlets such as the lovely Puy Robin set in the beautiful Gatine hill.

References

External links
 

Communes of Deux-Sèvres